The St. Johns River Shipbuilding Company was created in Jacksonville, Florida during World War II to build Liberty ships.

Company history
The company was established by local shipbuilder and repairer Merrill-Stevens with $17 million invested by the United States Maritime Commission. The company began operations in April 1942. Between then and August 1945 it produced 82 ships. The workforce grew from an initial 258 to 7,000 by August 1942, and to 20,000 by 1944. The yard was closed in August 1945.

Ships built 

The yard was one of those "owned outright" by the Maritime Commission, with total investment estimated at $16,145,471 plus $1,375,010 for land.

List of ships built by St. Johns River Shipbuilding Company:
 SS Richard Montgomery, Liberty ship, launched on 15 June 1943. Sunk in the Thames Estuary with explosive cargo still on board.
 SS John Philip Sousa, Liberty ship, launched on 4 July 1943
 USS Alkaid (AK-114), a Crater-class cargo ship, launched on 8 November 1943
 USS Crux (AK-115),  a Crater-class cargo ship, launched on 16 November 1943
 USS Shaula (AK-118), a Crater-class cargo ship, launched on 23 November 1943
 USS Matar (AK-119), a Crater-class cargo ship, launched on 30 November 1943
 USS Baham (AG-71), a Basilan-class miscellaneous auxiliary ship, launched on 21 December 1943
 USS Menkar (AK-123), a Crater-class cargo ship, launched on 31 December 1943
 SS Edwin G. Weed, Liberty ship, launched on 29 January 1944
 USS Melucta (AK-131),  a Crater-class cargo ship, launched on 20 March 1944
 SS Richard K. Call, Liberty ship, launched on 15 April 1944
 USS Naticoke (AOG-66), a T1 tanker type gasoline tanker, launched on 7 April 1945
 MS Transpet, was a tanker, launched on 5 May 1945.

Full list: shipbuildinghistory.com

References

External links

 List of ships built by St. Johns River Shipbuilding

1942 establishments in Florida
Defunct shipbuilding companies of the United States
Manufacturing companies based in Jacksonville, Florida
Vehicle manufacturing companies established in 1942
Vehicle manufacturing companies disestablished in 1945
1945 disestablishments in Florida
Shipbuilding companies of Florida
Defunct manufacturing companies based in Florida